David Alvin Buchsbaum (November 6, 1929 – January 8, 2021) was a mathematician at Brandeis University who worked on commutative algebra, homological algebra, and representation theory. He proved the Auslander–Buchsbaum formula and the Auslander–Buchsbaum theorem.

Career
Buchsbaum earned his Ph.D. under Samuel Eilenberg in 1954 from Columbia University with thesis Exact Categories and Duality. Among his doctoral students are Peter J. Freyd and Hema Srinivasan. In 2012 he became a fellow of the American Mathematical Society.

See also

Buchsbaum ring

References

External links

Home page of David Buchsbaum

1929 births
2021 deaths
20th-century American mathematicians
21st-century American mathematicians
Columbia University alumni
Brandeis University faculty
Fellows of the American Mathematical Society
Algebraists